HMS Hector was the lead ship of the  armoured frigates ordered by the Royal Navy in 1861. Upon completion in 1864, she was assigned to the Channel Fleet. The ship was paid off in 1867 to refit and be re-armed. Upon recommissioning in 1868, she was assigned as the guard ship of the Fleet Reserve in the southern district until 1886. She usually served as Queen Victoria's guard ship when the sovereign was resident at her vacation home on the Isle of Wight. Hector was paid off in 1886 and hulked in 1900 as a storage ship before being sold for scrap in 1905.

Design and description
They were modified versions of the Defence-class ships with additional armour and more powerful engines.
 
The ship was  overweight and displaced . The hull was subdivided by watertight transverse bulkheads into 92 compartments and had a double bottom underneath the engine and boiler rooms. While handy in manoeuvering, they rolled quite badly.

Propulsion
Hector had one 2-cylinder horizontal return connecting rod steam engine made by Robert Napier and Sons driving a single  propeller. The ship carried  of coal, enough to steam  at full speed. Hector was the first British ironclad to have her machinery made by her builders.

Her funnel was semi-retractable to reduce wind resistance while under sail alone. She was designed to allow the ship's propeller to be hoisted up into the stern of the ship to reduce drag while under sail, but the hoisting gear was never fitted.

Armament
The armament of the Hector-class ships was intended to be 32 smoothbore, muzzle-loading 68-pounder guns, 15 on each side on the main deck and one each fore and aft as chase guns on the upper deck. This was modified during construction to four rifled 110-pounder breech-loading guns and twenty-four 68-pounders. The breech-loading guns were a new design from Armstrong and much was hoped for them. To partially alleviate their overweight condition, the ships were not fully armed and only received four 110-pounders on the upper deck and twenty 68-pounders on the main deck behind armour. Firing tests carried out in September 1861 against an armoured target, however, proved that the 110-pounder was inferior to the 68-pounder smoothbore gun in armour penetration and repeated incidents of breech explosions during the Battles for Shimonoseki and the Bombardment of Kagoshima in 1863–1864 caused the navy to withdraw the gun from service shortly afterwards.

All of the guns could fire both solid shot and explosive shells.

Hector was rearmed during her 1867–1868 refit with sixteen 7-inch and two  rifled muzzle-loading guns. The two 8-inch guns were mounted on the quarterdeck where they could be fought in all weathers and four 7-inch guns were also fitted on the upper deck. The remaining twelve 7-inch guns were carried on the main deck. It was credited with the nominal ability to penetrate  armour.

Armour
To protect against raking fire the belt was closed off by 4.5-inch transverse bulkheads at each end at lower deck level. The main deck was protected by a strake of armour that ran the full length of the ship. The lack of armour at the stern meant that the steering gear was very vulnerable.

Service
HMS Hector was laid down on 8 March 1861 by Robert Napier and Sons at their shipyard in Govan. She was launched on 26 September 1862 and commissioned on 22 February 1864. She cost £294,000 to build, including a payment of £35,000 to her builders who had underestimated their costs. She served with the Channel Fleet until 1867, when she was paid off to be re-armed and to refit. She formed part of the Southern Reserve Fleet between 1868 until 1886; during this time her only military activity occurred when she was detailed to service in the Particular Service Squadron under the command of Admiral Hornsby during the Russian war scare of June–August 1878. Hector was assigned as Queen Victoria's guard ship nearly every summer during this period when the Queen, and her family, were in residence in Osborne House on the Isle of Wight. She was paid off at Portsmouth in 1886 and remained there, partly dismantled, until 1900 when she briefly became part of the torpedo school HMS Vernon as a store hulk. Hector became the first British warship to have wireless telegraphy installed when she conducted the first trials of the new equipment for the Royal Navy. The ship was sold for scrap in 1905.

Notes

Footnotes

References
 

Hector-class ironclads
Ships built in Govan
1862 ships
Victorian-era battleships of the United Kingdom